Robert J. Breckinridge may refer to:

 Robert Jefferson Breckinridge (1800–1871), American politician and Presbyterian minister
 Robert Jefferson Breckinridge, Jr. (1833–1915), Confederate Congressman and colonel in the Confederate Army